Suresh Ravi, is an Indian Video Jockey turned film actor who has mainly appeared in Tamil films. He was associated with various shows as an anchor in Sun Music channel. He made his debut into movies with Mo in 2016.

Filmography

Career
Suresh Ravi was born and brought up in Chennai. He had completed his B.E. Computer Science and Engineering from Jaya Engineering College and landed up as a Video jockey in Sun Music before quitting it to work as a project manager in Infosys. He later quit the job at Infosys and rejoined Sun Music after a span of around 06 months. He made his debut with the movie Mo in 2016 which was a  Tamil horror comedy film written and directed by Bhuvan Nullan, with Aishwarya Rajesh, Ramesh Thilak, Darbuka Siva and himself in the leading roles while Ramdoss, Pooja Devariya, Selva, and Mime Gopi played supporting roles.

References

Indian VJs (media personalities)
Indian male artists
Artists from Chennai
Year of birth missing (living people)
Living people